The 2017 FIBA U18 European Championship Division C was the 13th edition of the Division C of the FIBA U18 European Championship. It was played in Nicosia, Cyprus, from 4 to 9 July 2017. 8 teams participated in the competition. Norway men's national under-18 basketball team won the tournament.

Participating teams

  (24th place, 2016 FIBA U18 European Championship Division B)

First round

Group A

Group B

5th–8th place playoffs

Championship playoffs

Final standings

References

External links
FIBA official website

FIBA U18 European Championship Division C
2017–18 in European basketball
2017 in Cyprus
International basketball competitions hosted by Cyprus
July 2017 sports events in Europe